"Fruitcake" is the fifth single by The Superions, a side project of Fred Schneider of The B-52s.  The single was released to iTunes Stores as a digital download on September 21, 2010 and is featured on The Superions' Christmas album Destination... Christmas! which was released October 25, 2010 on Fanatic Records.

Track listing
 "Fruitcake" 3:36

Personnel 
Band
 Fred Schneider - lyrics and vocals
 Noah Brodie - keyboards, electronic drums and vocals
 Dan Marshall - programming and vocals

Production
 Recorded and mixed by The Superions
 Producer: The Superions
 Mastering: Bob Katz at Digital Domain
 Additional mixing: Jarrett Pritchard
 Artwork: Brian Fraley

Music video
A music video was filmed using iPhone 4 on September 10–12, 2010 in Orlando.  The video premiered on My Old Kentucky Blog on September 21, 2010.

Yacht Remix
"Fruitcake (Yacht Remix)" was released on December 20, 2010 as a free download on Yacht's website.

External links
 Fruitcake - Single on iTunes

References

The Superions songs
2010 songs
Songs written by Fred Schneider